Martin Marty  (January 12, 1834 – September 19, 1896) was a Swiss-born Benedictine missionary and bishop in the United States.  His birth name was James Joseph Alois Marty.

Marty was the first abbot of St. Meinrad Monastery in Indiana, the first vicar apostolic of Dakota Territory, where he ministered to the Lakota Sioux; and the second bishop of the Roman Catholic Diocese of Saint Cloud. His zeal for the Native American missions earned him the title, "The Apostle of the Sioux".

Biography

Early life 
James Marty was born in the Canton Schwyz, Switzerland, on January 12, 1834, the son of a shoemaker and church sexton and his wife. Before the age of two, he severely burned his mouth and face in an accident when trying to drink from a bottle of acid in his father's shop. The acid caused swelling that nearly suffocated him; it left his face permanently disfigured.

After graduating from the Jesuit-run gymnasium in his hometown, Marty was granted a musical scholarship to the Jesuit college at Fribourg. There he heard about the work of Jesuit Father Pierre De Smet in western North America, and was inspired to work as a missionary among the American Indians. After the Sonderbund War of 1847, the Jesuit Order was expelled by Switzerland's Anti-Catholic government. The Benedictine Order worked to fill the ensuing educational vacuum. On December 21, 1847, young Marty was enrolled at the Benedictine school attached to Einsiedeln Abbey.

Priesthood 
After graduation, Marty entered the Benedictine novitiate at age 20; he took his final vows on May 29, 1855, assuming the name Brother Martin Marty. He was ordained to the priesthood for the Benedictine Order by Bishop Johann Peter Mirer in Switzerland on September 14, 1856. In 1859, he was assigned a professorship of moral theology.

In 1860, Abbot Heinrich Schmid von Baar ordered Marty to travel to the United States to take over the abbey's debt-ridden daughter house at St. Meinrad, Indiana. Although the assignment was intended to last only one year, Marty proved so adept at building up the formerly failing monastery that Schmid von Baar decided that it was God's will for his young protégé to remain there. When the conventual priory was established five years later, Marty was selected as the first prior.

Abbot of Saint Meinrad Seminary 
On September 30, 1870, Saint Meinrad was upgraded to an independent abbey by Pope Pius IX. In January 1872, Marty was elected as its first abbot. The investiture ceremony in May 1872 was conducted by Bishop Jacques-Maurice de Saint Palais and Abbot Boniface Wimmer.

In 1875, Marty instituted a change in the devotional practice of the St. Meinrad Abbey, substituting the Roman Breviary for the Benedictine Breviary. When this policy caused a major uproar, the dispute was referred to the Sacred Congregation of Rites in Rome. On March 9, 1876, word reached Marty that the Congregation had ruled against him and ordered him to reinstate the Traditional Breviary. Although Marty immediately obeyed, he would always feel that he had undergone a "temporary defeat" in his dream of drawing the Benedictine Order closer to diocesan clergy, who used the Roman Breviary. His failure would leave him disheartened with life at St. Meinrad and anxious to obtain a new pastorate.

During Marty's tenure as abbot, he initiated an agreement with the Little Rock and Fort Smith Railroad (LR&FS), which offered the Order land in Arkansas to establish a monastery and school to serve the German Catholic population the railroad was attracting to the region. The railroad had control of thousands of acres through government subsidies. It granted St. Meinrad Abbey  to establish a Benedictine monastery for monks and an additional  to found a monastery for Benedictine nuns.

Marty is credited with the founding of St. Benedict's Priory in Arkansas in 1878, with three monks from St. Meinrad Archabbey. An additional monk and eight candidates for the monastery came from Switzerland the following year. This monastery became independent in 1886, as a conventual priory, and in 1891 it was raised by the pope as an abbey, to be known as Subiaco Abbey.

In July 1876, Marty departed Indiana by steamer for Standing Rock in Dakota Territory, along the upper Missouri River, where he intended to found a Benedictine monastery to assist the Native American missions.

Vicar Apostolic of Dakota Territory 
On August 12, 1879, Pope Leo XIII appointed Marty as vicar apostolic of the Dakota Territory; he was consecrated bishop on February 1, 1880, by Bishop Silas Chatard and named titular bishop of Tiberias. Marty then resigned the abbacy.

Marty worked among the Lakota Sioux living on the Standing Rock Reservation in North and South Dakota. The Hunkpapa Dakota called him "Black Robe Lean Chief".

The area was first under the jurisdiction of the Apostolic Vicariate of Nebraska. As the Dakota Territory had only 12 Catholic priests, Marty actively recruited priests from the Eastern United States and Europe. In 1880 Marty persuaded Benedictine sisters from Missouri to assist him in ministering at Fort Yates, a center of Yankton Lakota.

In 1884, Marty attended the Third Plenary council in Baltimore, Maryland. He served on the committee to establish the Catholic University of America in Washington, D.C. Marty was appointed president of the Bureau of Catholic Indian Missions.

Bishop of Sioux Falls 
On November 26, 1889, Pope Leo XIII appointed Marty first bishop of the Diocese of Sioux Falls, which, at that time, comprised all of the state of South Dakota.

Bishop of Saint Cloud 
Leo XIII appointed Marty as bishop of the Diocese of St. Cloud on January 18, 1895, even though Marty was already quite ill.  Martin Marty died on September 19, 1896 at age 62.

Legacy 
The town of Marty, South Dakota and Mount Marty University in Yankton, South Dakota are named after Marty.

Quote
 "Happy would I be if I could sacrifice for God what Custer threw away to the world."

References

External links 
 
 Bishop Martin Marty (in German)

 

1834 births
1896 deaths
Roman Catholic bishops of Sioux Falls
Roman Catholic bishops of Saint Cloud
19th-century Roman Catholic bishops in the United States
People of Dakota Territory
Swiss emigrants to the United States
People from Spencer County, Indiana
People from St. Cloud, Minnesota
American Benedictines
Catholics from Indiana
Benedictine bishops
Roman Catholic missionaries in the United States